The Tournament Most Outstanding Player was an annual award given out at the conclusion of the NCAA Men's Ice Hockey Championship to the player to be judged the most outstanding. The award was in effect for the first 7 tournaments and when the tournament was restarted in 1993 no individual awards were conferred.

Award winners

Award Breakdown

References 

+
Most Outstanding Player